Taserface is a fictional character appearing in American comic books published by Marvel Comics. He is a supervillain and a recurring adversary of the original Guardians of the Galaxy.

Taserface appears in several forms of media, such as the Marvel Cinematic Universe film Guardians of the Galaxy Vol. 2 (2017) and Disney+ animated series What If...? (2021) as a different version, portrayed by Chris Sullivan.

Publication history

Taserface first appeared in Guardians of the Galaxy #1 (June 1990), drawn and written by Jim Valentino. Valentino stated that his son Aaron Valentino, who was five years old at the time, came up with the name. Jim thought the name was "kind of lame...but no worse than Pruneface, Clayface, Two-Face or any other character with the word face as part of their name."

Fictional character biography
Taserface is an advance scout for the Stark and came from a planet inhabited by primitive beings. One day, a cache of armor and technology created by Tony Stark wound up on their planet. The inhabitants quickly adapted themselves to the new technology, calling themselves the Stark after their idol, and proceeded to misuse their new found gift to conquer other planets.

He was deployed to the planet Courg to keep an eye on it and ended up fighting the Guardians of the Galaxy. After his defeat he was tortured by his species and had his name taken from him. Now going by the name Nameless One, his hatred for the Guardians grew.

He pleads mercy to the High Sister for redemption and is given upgrades. He returns with the name Overkill after being transformed into a cyborg. He fights Hollywood, an alternate version of Wonder Man, and is easily defeated. He attempts to detonate himself in a last minute revenge scheme, but Hollywood absorbs the blast, killing only Overkill.

Powers and abilities
Taserface possesses some degree of invulnerability due to being a cyborg. He also has a vast array of weapons at his disposal including repulsor rays, sensors and tasers. He also has the ability to absorb energy and redirect it.

In other media

Television
Taserface appears in the animated special Lego Marvel Super Heroes - Guardians of the Galaxy: The Thanos Threat, voiced by Travis Willingham. He accompanies Yondu and the other Ravagers to steal the Power Stone from Ronan the Accuser.

Marvel Cinematic Universe

Chris Sullivan portrays Taserface in media set in the Marvel Cinematic Universe. This version is the lieutenant of Yondu Udonta's faction of the Ravagers. Additionally, he is depicted as being proud of his name, believing it strikes fear into the hearts of his enemies. However, Rocket and the rest of the Ravagers scoff at the ridiculousness of his name. 
 Taserface is introduced in the live-action film Guardians of the Galaxy Vol. 2. After officially being assigned to direct the film Guardians of the Galaxy and considering Taserface to be "the dumbest character of all time", director James Gunn jokingly posted a photo of him on his social media. He later clarified that he would never feature the character in a film. Gunn later changed his mind, and while crafting this character, felt that Taserface had named himself. Hence, he described him as "a real dumbass", yet also "a very powerful guy." Discussing the character's look in The Art of the Film, Visual Development Illustrator Anthony Francisco says, "Taserface was described to me as needing to be very scary-looking, but he wants you to think he is the absolute coolest. I translated this into conceptualizing various things he might wear or add onto his Ravager jumpsuit — things that he thinks are badass or interesting. But ultimately, he is just trying too hard." Feeling that Yondu is "going soft", Taserface leads a mutiny against him and kills anyone still loyal to the former. After Kraglin aids Yondu, Rocket, and Groot in escaping from their prison cells, Yondu kills the remaining Ravagers and destroys the main engine, causing the Ravager ship to explode. While the four escape in a smaller escape ship, Taserface contacts the Sovereign to give them Yondu's coordinates before dying in the explosion.
 An alternate timeline version of Taserface appears in the Disney+ animated series What If...? episode "What If... T'Challa Became a Star-Lord?", with Sullivan reprising the role.

Video games
Taserface appears as a playable character in Lego Marvel Super Heroes 2, voiced by Simon Kerr.

References

External links
 Taserface at Marvel Wiki

Comics characters introduced in 1990
Fictional characters with disfigurements
Guardians of the Galaxy characters
Marvel Comics aliens
Marvel Comics cyborgs
Marvel Comics extraterrestrial supervillains
Marvel Comics male characters